Serpil Çapar (born July 7, 1981) is a Turkish women's handballer, who plays in the Turkish Women's Handball Super League for Zağmos SK. She was member of the Turkey national team. The -tall sportswoman is goalkeeper.

Playing career

Club
Çapar began her handball career at YKM SK, and enjoyed league champion title with her team in the 1997–98 season. She later transferred to Üsküdar Belediyespor, where she played until the end of the 2012–13 season. During this period, her team became twice league champion and five times runner-up.

Çapar joined Kastamonu Bld. GSK in the 2014–15 season. For the next season, she signed with her hometown club Zağmos SK.

She took part at the Women's EHF Champions League (1997–98 and 2011–12), the Women's EHF Challenge Cup (2001–02, 2006–07 and 2012–13), the Women's EHF Cup (2002–03, 2007–08 and 2008–09) as well as the Women's EHF Cup Winners' Cup (2003–04, 2009–10, 2010–11 and 2011–12).

International
Çapar played in the Turkey women's national team.

She was part of the team, which won the silver medal at the 2009 Mediterranean Games held in Pescara, Italy. In July 2013, she announced her retirement from the national team after the match against Spain at the 2013 Mediterranean Games held in Mersin, Turkey.

Honours
Turkish Women's Handball Super League
 Winners (3): 1997–98, 2003–04, 2010–11
 Runners-up (5): 2007–08, 2008–09, 2009–10, 2011–12, 2012–13.
 Third place (1): 2014–15

Handball at the Mediterranean Games
 Runner-up (1): 2009

References 

1981 births
Sportspeople from Trabzon
Turkish female handball players
Üsküdar Belediyespor players
Kastamonu Bld. SK (women's handball) players
Zağnos SK (women's handball) players
Turkey women's national handball players
Living people
Mediterranean Games silver medalists for Turkey
Competitors at the 2009 Mediterranean Games
Mediterranean Games medalists in handball
21st-century Turkish women